The Charlotte mayoral election of 2003 was held on 4 November 2003 to elect a Mayor of Charlotte, North Carolina.  It was won by Republican incumbent Pat McCrory, who won a fifth consecutive term by defeating Democratic nominee Craig Madans in the general election.

Primaries

Democratic primary

Republican primary

General election

Footnotes

2003
Charlotte
2003 North Carolina elections